Herman Van der Slagmolen (born 31 October 1948) is a Belgian former professional racing cyclist. He rode in the 1976 Tour de France.

References

External links
 

1948 births
Living people
Belgian male cyclists
People from Asse
Cyclists from Flemish Brabant